Robert Molesworth Kindersley, 1st Baron Kindersley  (21 November 1871 – 20 July 1954) was an English businessman, stockbroker, merchant banker, and public servant who organised the National Savings movement.

Background
Kindersley was born in Wanstead, Essex, son of Edward Nassau Molesworth Kindersley, of Sherborne, Dorset, and Ada Good, daughter of John Murray. His father was an Old Etonian and Oxford graduate from a wealthy family who had been a captain in the Green Howards and the Indian Army, but had fallen on hard times since resigning his commission and becoming a chemist, working for Scott & Co. Chemical Works at Bow, London; he was also a director of the Anglo American Leather Cloth Company. Kindersley was educated at Repton School, but was forced to leave in 1887 when his father could no longer afford the fees. Kindersley was great-grandson of the civil servant and translator Nathaniel Edward Kindersley, whose mother, Jemima Kindersley (née Wickstead), was a travel writer.

Banking career
He then became a clerk in several London firms before joining the London Stock Exchange in 1901, becoming a partner in David A. Bevan & Co in 1902 and the merchant bank Lazard Brothers & Co in 1905, a firm with which he was connected for the rest of his life and of which he became chairman in 1919.

Public service
From 1915 to 1925, Kindersley was Governor (Company Chairman) of the Hudson's Bay Company, North America's oldest company (established by English royal charter in 1670). He served as a director of the Bank of England from 1914 to 1946. In 1924 he was the senior British representative on the Dawes Committee.

Kindersley is chiefly recognised for his work as chairman of the National Savings Committee from 1916 to 1920; he was then its president until 1946.

He was also a major shareholder in the Canadian Northern Railway, later amalgamated into Canadian National Railways, and the town of Kindersley, Saskatchewan, was named after him.

Personal life
He married Gladys Margaret Beadle, daughter of Maj-Gen James Prinsep Beadle, of Worton Grange, co. Wiltshire, on 3 November 1896 and had six children, Lionel, Hugh, Margaret, Richard, Philip (who married Oonagh Guinness and Valerie Violet French) and Elizabeth. Lord Kindersley was succeeded in the Barony by his second son Hugh, his eldest son Lionel having been killed in action in the First World War.

Honours and arms
Kindersley was knighted as Knight Commander of the Order of the British Empire (KBE) in 1917 and raised to Knight Grand Cross (GBE) in the 1920 civilian war honours for his chairmanship of the National Savings Committee. He served as High Sheriff of Sussex for 1928 and in 1941 was raised to the peerage as Baron Kindersley, of West Hoathly in the County of West Sussex.

References

Biography, Oxford Dictionary of National Biography

External links
 

1871 births
1954 deaths
English stockbrokers
People from Wanstead
People educated at Repton School
English businesspeople
English bankers
Knights Grand Cross of the Order of the British Empire
Governors of the Hudson's Bay Company
High Sheriffs of Sussex
Robert
Barons created by George VI